The Nation Alliance  is an Islamist electoral alliance in Egypt.

Affiliated parties
Flag Party
Egyptian Reform Party
Authenticity Party
People Party
Islamic Party
Virtue Party
New Labour Party

References

Political party alliances in Egypt
2013 establishments in Egypt